BitTorrent is a proprietary adware BitTorrent client developed by Bram Cohen and Rainberry, Inc. used for uploading and downloading files via the BitTorrent protocol. BitTorrent was the first client written for the protocol. It is often nicknamed Mainline by developers denoting its official origins. Since version 6.0 the BitTorrent client has been a rebranded version of μTorrent. As a result, it is no longer open source. It is currently available for Microsoft Windows, Mac, Linux, iOS and Android. There are currently two versions of the software, "BitTorrent Classic" which inherits the historical version numbering, and "BitTorrent Web", which uses its own version numbering.

History
Programmer Bram Cohen designed the protocol in April 2001 and released a first implementation of the BitTorrent client on 2 July 2001. It is now maintained by Cohen's company BitTorrent, Inc.

Prior to version 6.0, BitTorrent was written in Python, and was free software. Very early versions released prior to December 30, 2001 were released into the public domain without a license. Versions up to and including 3.4.2 were distributed under the MIT license. The source code for versions 4.x and 5.x was released under the BitTorrent Open Source License, a modified version of the Jabber Open Source License.  Versions 4.0 and 5.3 were relicensed under the GPL.

Version 4.20 of the client was dubbed Allegro by BitTorrent Inc., in reference to protocol extensions developed by the company to accelerate download performance and ISP manageability.

Version 5.30 of the client which is snapshotted at Internet Archive is the latest open source version.

Since version 6.0, which was released on September 18th 2007, the BitTorrent client has been a rebranded version of μTorrent. It is no longer open source.

Features 
The BitTorrent client enables a user to search for and download torrent files using a built-in search box ("Search for torrents") in the main window, which opens the BitTorrent torrent search engine page with the search results in the user's default web browser.

The current client includes a range of features, including multiple parallel downloads. BitTorrent has several statistical, tabular and graphical views that allow a user to see what events are happening in the background. A host of views offer information on the peers and seeds to which the user is connected, including how much data is being downloaded from each and to how much data is being uploaded by each. It has an automatic recovery system that checks all data that has been handled after an improper shutdown. It also intermediates peering between itself, source file servers ("trackers") and other clients, thereby yielding distribution efficiencies. The client also enables users to create and share torrent files.

Release history

BitTorrent DNA 

BitTorrent DNA (BitTorrent Delivery Network Accelerator) is a program designed to speed up the viewing of streaming video, downloading software (with or without the BitTorrent protocol) and playing online video games. It does so by distributing the end users' downloads between each other. In this way, the developers intend that content providers should take less load on their servers so the end users can receive the content faster. It runs in the background whenever the operating system is running.

BitTorrent DNA is different from traditional BitTorrent in that it relies on publisher HTTP servers in order to provide publishers with guaranteed minimum data delivery rate, as well as give publishers control over content delivery (peers must connect to the origin server before they can reach other peers), and collect information about content delivery to share with the publisher. The quality of the file transfer is specified in terms of a long-term average bitrate for data and in terms of meeting deadlines when streaming.  It also can give bandwidth to TCP and other traffic.

DNA is also different from traditional BitTorrent in that it is a UDP-based protocol that has replaced regular TCP-based bandwidth throttling with a much more sensitive bandwidth management technique.

Apart from being installed by third party websites and software companies, the program for end users is also installed when the official BitTorrent client is installed (starting with the rebranded version 6.0). However, it can be independently uninstalled.

The first version of the DNA made it possible to keep the DNA application installed and yet temporarily stopped until the next system restart (through the system's control panel, in Windows XP). The DNA GUI was completely removed in the official BitTorrent version 6.1 and 6.1.1, but was re-introduced in version 6.1.2.

Since October, 2007 BitTorrent DNA has been offered by BitTorrent, Inc. as a commercial service that content providers can purchase (for an undisclosed price) and as a free background program for end users. Company President Ashwin Navin launched the product claiming that "Implementing BitTorrent DNA on top of legacy infrastructure has the profound impact of allowing our customers to deliver a better user experience, higher quality video, faster software downloads, all with the security and reliability of a managed service."

Navin in a podcast interview claimed that he attempted to sell BitTorrent DNA in January 2005. After finding that BitTorrent's brand was too polarizing for potential customers, they delayed the launch until after partnering with nearly 50 media companies in the BitTorrent Entertainment Network. That provided the company enough public validation to finally launch BitTorrent DNA two and half years later.

The service's first customer was the company Brightcove, that chose to use it to distribute streaming video files.

As of May 2009, the Asus support website is using BitTorrent DNA as an additional download method of their larger files in addition to their multiple somewhat internationally distributed HTTP servers and content delivery mirrors and other redirection facilities Asus has been known to rely in the present and past for their data delivery needs. Currently, a separate "P2P" icon is being presented for the DNA style downloads next to the "Global" and "Chinese" located servers as an example.

See also 
 Comparison of BitTorrent clients
 Usage share of BitTorrent clients

References

External links 

 
 Glasnost test BitTorrent traffic shaping (Max Planck Institute for Software Systems)

Android (operating system) software
BitTorrent clients
C++ software
File sharing software
BitTorrent clients for Linux
MacOS file sharing software
Windows file sharing software